Xavier Vieira de Vasconcelos (born 14 January 1992) is an Andorran footballer who has represented the Andorra national football team.

International career
Vieira played his first international game with the national team on 15 October 2013, in a friendly against Hungary where he came in as a substitute for Edu Peppe after 80 minutes.

References

Living people
1992 births
Andorran footballers
Andorra international footballers
Association football midfielders
Atlético Monzón players
FC Lusitanos players